Mount Olive is located on the Continental Divide, on the Alberta-British Columbia border, in both Banff National Park and Yoho National Park. It lies on the eastern edge of the Wapta Icefield, and is part of the Waputik Mountains. It was named in 1898 by H.B. Dixon after his wife Dixon, Olive.

Geology
The peak is composed of sedimentary rock laid down during the Precambrian to Jurassic periods. Formed in shallow seas, this sedimentary rock was pushed east and over the top of younger rock during the Laramide orogeny.

Climate
Based on the Köppen climate classification, it is located in a subarctic climate with cold, snowy winters, and mild summers. Temperatures can drop below -20 °C with wind chill factors below -30 °C.

See also 
 List of peaks on the Alberta–British Columbia border

Further reading

References

Three-thousanders of Alberta
Three-thousanders of British Columbia
Canadian Rockies
Mountains of Banff National Park
Mountains of Yoho National Park